Klokovo is a rural locality (a village) in Ustretskoye Rural Settlement, Syamzhensky District, Vologda Oblast, Russia. The population was 9 as of 2002.

Geography 
Klokovo is located 30 km northwest of Syamzha (the district's administrative centre) by road. Puronga is the nearest rural locality.

References 

Rural localities in Syamzhensky District